In Early Arizona is a 1938 American Western film directed by Joseph Levering and written by Nate Gatzert. The film stars Wild Bill Elliott, Dorothy Gulliver, Harry Woods, Jack Ingram, Franklyn Farnum and Frank Ellis. The film was released on November 2, 1938, by Columbia Pictures.

Plot
Marshal Jeff sends his friend Whit Gordon to help Tombstone, a city where Bull and his gang rule with help of the Sheriff and the Judge.

Cast          
Wild Bill Elliott as Whit Gordon
Dorothy Gulliver as Alice Weldon
Harry Woods as Bull
Jack Ingram as Marshal Jeff Bowers
Franklyn Farnum as Spike 
Frank Ellis as Ben
Art Davis as Art
Charles King as Kaintuck
Ed Cassidy as Tom Weldon 
Slim Whitaker as Sheriff E.W. Wilson

References

External links
 

1938 films
American Western (genre) films
1938 Western (genre) films
Columbia Pictures films
American black-and-white films
Films directed by Joseph Levering
1930s English-language films
1930s American films